Dias Jirenbayev (born 3 October 2003) is a Kazakhstani figure skater. He is the 2022 CS Denis Ten Memorial Challenge silver medalist and a three-time Kazakhstani senior national medalist (silver in 2020 and 2021, bronze in 2019).

Personal life 
Jirenbayev was born on 3 October 2003 in Taraz, Kazakhstan.

Programs

Competitive highlights 
CS: Challenger Series; JGP: Junior Grand Prix.

References

External links 
 

2003 births
Living people
Kazakhstani male single skaters
People from Taraz
Sportspeople from Almaty
Competitors at the 2023 Winter World University Games